Michael Tayo (born 17 April) is a Nigerian football player who currently plays for Southern Samity in the Calcutta Football League as a central midfielder. He has represented SC Goa  and Air India FC

References

External links
 http://goal.com/en-india/people/nigeria/25055/michael-tayo

1987 births
Living people
Nigerian footballers
Nigerian expatriate footballers
Nigerian expatriate sportspeople in India
Expatriate footballers in India
Sporting Clube de Goa players
Place of birth missing (living people)
Association football midfielders